The Deoksu Jang clan is one of the bon-gwan or Korean clans from Kaepung County, North Hwanghae Province.The clan was founded by , an Arab-Uiguric Muslim civil servant who served in the Goryeo court.

According to the research held in 2015, the clan has 24,185 members.

Origin

Jang Sun Ryong entered Goryeo as a fatherly master of Princess Jeguk, daughter of Kublai Khan, who was married off to Chungnyeol of Goryeo.

See also 
 Korean clan names of foreign origin

References

External links 
 

 
Jang clans
Arab diaspora in Asia